Rochon Sands Provincial Park is a provincial park located in Alberta, Canada. It is located on the south shore of Buffalo Lake, within the summer village of Rochon Sands. This provincial park can be accessed by traveling northeast from Red Deer on Highway 11, or northwest from Stettler on Highway 12 and secondary Highway 835. The park was established on January 8, 1957.

External links
 Alberta Community Development - Rochon Sands Provincial Park

Provincial parks of Alberta